Ludwig Peka is a Papua New Guinean professional football manager. Since 2003 until 2004 he coached the Papua New Guinea national football team.

References

External links
Profile at Soccerway.com
Profile at Soccerpunter.com

Year of birth missing (living people)
Living people
Papua New Guinean football managers
Papua New Guinea national football team managers
Place of birth missing (living people)